Soria Zeroual (born 14 May 1970) is an Algerian cleaning lady and non-professional actress. Zeroual has been living in France since 2002. She plays the title role in the film Fatima, directed by Philippe Faucon. She was nominated for the César Award for Best Actress for her role in the film.

References

External links

 

1970 births
Living people
21st-century Algerian actresses
Algerian expatriates in France